Wintertime is the coldest season of the year in polar and temperate zones.

Wintertime may also refer to:
 Standard time, the time without the offset for daylight saving time which is also known as summer time
 Winter time (clock lag), lagging the clock from the standard time during winter
 Wintertime (film), a 1943 American film
 "Wintertime", a single by Kayak from the 1974 album Kayak II
 "Winter Time", a song on the 1977 Steve Miller Band album Book of Dreams
 several volumes of the manga series Silver Spoon

See also 
 
 Winter (disambiguation)